The 2009 Queensland House and Land.com 300  was the eighth race meeting of the 2009 V8 Supercar Championship Series. It contained Races 15 and 16 of the series and was held on the weekend of August 21 to 23 at Queensland Raceway in Ipswich, Queensland.

Results
Results as follows:

Qualifying
Qualifying timesheets:

Race 15 results
Race timesheets:

Qualifying
Qualifying timesheets:

Race 16 results
Race timesheets:

Standings
After race 16 of 26.

Support categories
The 2009 Queensland House and Land.com 300 had four support categories.

References

External links
Official series website
Official timing and results

Queensland House and Land.com 300
August 2009 sports events in Australia